Ashcraft v. Tennessee, 322 U.S. 143 (1944), is a United States Supreme Court case.

The defendant in the case, E.E. Ashcraft, was charged with hiring John Ware to murder Ashcraft's wife, Zelma Ida Ashcraft. Ashcraft and Ware confessed to the crimes and were sentenced to 99 years in the state penitentiary. Ware and Ashcraft appealed, claiming that their confessions were extorted from them. Ware, a black man, claimed that he confessed because he feared mob violence. Ashcraft - who had been questioned for more than 36 hours, with only one 5-minute break - claimed he was threatened and abused.

The Supreme Court of Tennessee affirmed both men's convictions.  However, neither they nor the original Trial Court ruled that the confessions were voluntarily made.  On this question, they deferred to the jury, which had decided that the confessions were voluntary.  After making an "independent examination", the United States Supreme Court reversed both convictions.

Justices Jackson, Roberts and Frankfurter dissented because they felt the Supreme Court did not grant sufficient deference to the State Courts' rulings.

This case is important, in part, because of the Court's decision not to grant deference to the jury's determination that the defendants' confessions were voluntary.

External links
 

United States Supreme Court cases
United States Supreme Court cases of the Stone Court
1944 in United States case law
United States evidence case law
United States Supreme Court criminal cases